Piglet's Big Movie is a 2003 American/British animated musical comedy-drama film released by Walt Disney Pictures on March 21, 2003. The film features the characters from the Winnie-the-Pooh books written by A. A. Milne and E. H. Shepard, and is the third theatrically released Winnie the Pooh feature.  In this film, Piglet is ashamed of being small and clumsy and wanders off into the Hundred Acre Wood, leading all of his friends to form a search party to find him.

Piglet's Big Movie was produced by the Japanese office of Disneytoon Studios and the animation production was by Walt Disney Animation Japan, Inc. with additional animation provided by Gullwing Co., Ltd., additional background by Studio Fuga and digital ink and paint by T2 Studio.

Plot
Pooh, Tigger, Eeyore, and Rabbit are working on a plan to get honey from a beehive by tricking the bees into leaving their hive. Piglet arrives and wants to help, but is told that he is too small to help. The plan goes awry when the bees see through the plan, but Piglet manages to divert the bees into a new hive and trap them. Unfortunately, Piglet's friends take all the credit for themselves when they fail to notice Piglet's heroism, making him leave dejectedly. After the bees break free, Pooh, Rabbit, Tigger, and Eeyore escape to Piglet's house. When they notice that Piglet is missing, they decide to find him after being joined by Roo. Using Piglet's scrapbook as a guide, the five use the pictures to tell the stories depicted therein, leading to several flashbacks.

The first story told is when Kanga and Roo first moved to the Hundred Acre Wood. Pooh, Piglet, Tigger, and Rabbit are afraid of the newcomers and Rabbit concocts a plan to use Piglet as a decoy, so they could ransom Roo to force Kanga to leave. When Kanga finds out about the plan, she plays along by pretending that Piglet is Roo, where Piglet learns of how nice she is. Meanwhile, Roo and Rabbit get along and, realizing how nice they are, everyone agrees to let Kanga and Roo stay.

The second story is of the expedition to find the North Pole. When Roo falls into the river, Piglet uses a long stick to launch him out. Unfortunately, his heroism is overlooked when he gives the stick to Pooh to try to catch Roo (where he is caught by his mother), and Christopher Robin credits Pooh with finding the North Pole (the stick). Back in the present, the friends regret not sharing the praise with Piglet.

The third story concerns the building of the House at Pooh Corner. Piglet gets the idea of building Eeyore a house in an area they named "Pooh Corner" and are joined by Tigger to build it. As Tigger and Pooh build the house after finding some neatly stacked sticks, Piglet struggles to keep up and every attempt to build the house falls apart. Tigger and Pooh go to inform Eeyore of the bad news, leaving Piglet behind. When they find Eeyore, he says that he already built himself a house out of sticks, revealing that the sticks Pooh and Tigger found was his house. Piglet then arrives and leads them back to Eeyore’s newly completed house. Once again, Piglet’s contributions are overlooked as the wind gets the credit for moving Eeyore’s house.

Back in the present, an argument between Rabbit and Tigger ends with the scrapbook falling into a river. Without their guide, the friends return to Piglet's house and, after making drawings of Piglet's heroism, the friends again resolve to find Piglet. During their search, they come across several pages from the scrapbook, which have floated downstream, where they find the book's bindings suspended on a hollow log looming over a waterfall. Pooh goes to retrieve it, but he falls into a hole in the log, and the others are unable to reach him. At that moment, Piglet arrives and helps pull Pooh to safety just as the log begins to break in half. Eeyore, Rabbit, Roo and Tigger manage to escape, but the front half breaks off, making the survivors believe that Piglet and Pooh perished. Fortunately, Pooh and Piglet managed to get out in time by jumping into the bottom half of the log and reunite with their friends.

Piglet's friends take him back to his house to show him their new drawings. During a party the next day, Pooh takes Piglet to Eeyore's house, revealing that he changed the sign to read "Pooh and Piglet Corner". When everyone else arrives, Pooh claims that "it's the least [they] could do for a very small Piglet who has done such very big things."

Cast
 John Fiedler as Piglet
 Jim Cummings as Winnie the Pooh / Tigger
 Andre Stojka as Owl
 Kath Soucie as Kanga
 Nikita Hopkins as Roo
 Peter Cullen as Eeyore
 Ken Sansom as Rabbit
 Tom Wheatley as Christopher Robin
 Kath Soucie as Christopher Robin's singing voice

Production
Piglet's Big Movie was produced by Disneytoon Studios, Walt Disney Animation (Japan), Gullwing Co., Ltd, Studio Fuga, and T2 Studio.

Music

American singer-songwriter Carly Simon wrote seven new songs for the film, and performed six of them ("If I Wasn't So Small", "Mother's Intuition", "Sing Ho for the Life of a Bear", "With a Few Good Friends", "The More I Look Inside", and "Comforting to Know"), as well as recording her own version of the Sherman brothers' "Winnie the Pooh" theme song.

"The More It Snows" features Jim Cummings and John Fiedler, as Pooh and Piglet. Simon was accompanied by her children Ben Taylor and Sally Taylor on many of the songs. Renée Fleming accompanied Simon on the song "Comforting to Know". On "Sing Ho for the Life of a Bear" Simon was accompanied by the cast.

The soundtrack also features five tracks of the film's score by Carl Johnson, as well as five of Simon's original demonstration recordings.

Songs
Original songs performed in the film include:

Reception

Box office
Piglet's Big Movie was number seven on the box-office charts on its opening weekend, earning $6 million. The film domestically grossed $23 million, half the amount of what The Tigger Movie earned, and it grossed nearly $63 million worldwide.

Critical response
On Rotten Tomatoes, the film received a "Certified Fresh" rating of 70% based on 77 reviews, and an average rating of 6.2/10. The site's critical consensus is "Wholesome and charming entertainment for young children." On Metacritic the film has a score of 62/100 based on reviews from 23 critics. Audiences surveyed by CinemaScore gave the film a grade A, on a scale of A+ to F.

Film critic Stephen Holden of New York Times called the film an "oasis of gentleness and wit." Nancy Churnin of The Dallas Morning News stated that Piglet's Big Movie was "one of the nifty pleasures in the process", despite her belief that "Disney may be milking its classics."

Accolades

Games
In 2003, Disney released Piglet's Big Game for the PlayStation 2, GameCube, and Game Boy Advance, as well as a CD-ROM game, which was also entitled Piglet's Big Game. The latter is developed by Doki Denki Studio and involves helping Piglet assist in the preparation for a "Very Large Soup Party."
 In their review, Edutaining Kids praised various features including the adventure/exploration aspect (the game is linear instead of using a main screen) and many of the activities (such as the color mixing, which they said offers an incredible variety of hues), but noted that it is much too brief and that Kanga and Roo are absent.

Sources

The film's plot is based primarily on five A. A. Milne stories: "In which Piglet meets a Heffalump," "In which Kanga and Baby Roo Come to the Forest, and Piglet Has a Bath," and  "In which Christopher Robin Leads an Expedition to the North Pole" (chapters 5, 7, and 8 of Winnie-the-Pooh); and "In which a house is built at Pooh Corner for Eeyore" and "In which a search is organized and Piglet nearly meets the Heffalump again" (chapters 1 and 3 of The House at Pooh Corner).

Releases
The film was released on VHS and DVD on July 29, 2003.

References

External links
 
 

2003 films
2003 animated films
2000s adventure films
2000s American animated films
2000s musical comedy-drama films
2003 fantasy films
2000s English-language films
American children's animated adventure films
American children's animated comedy films
American children's animated drama films
American children's animated fantasy films
American children's animated musical films
American films with live action and animation
American comedy-drama films
American sequel films
American animated feature films
Animated drama films
Animated musical films
Winnie the Pooh (franchise)
Children's comedy-drama films
DisneyToon Studios animated films
Winnie-the-Pooh films
Walt Disney Pictures films
Films directed by Francis Glebas
Animated films about friendship
2003 comedy-drama films
2000s children's animated films
Films about pigs